Good Witch is an American-Canadian fantasy comedy-drama television series that is based on, and a continuation of, the television film series of the same name. Produced by Whizbang Films in association with ITV Studios and the Hallmark Channel, the series premiered on February 28, 2015, and ran for seven seasons, ending on July 25, 2021.

Catherine Bell, who plays Cassie Nightingale, the titular "good witch" of the film series, both co-produced and starred in the series. The series follows the residents of the fictional town of Middleton, including Cassie and her daughter Grace as they welcome Dr. Sam Radford and his son to town. Cassie and Grace share a gift of enchanted insight and magical intuition. The season-five finale marked the last regular appearance for actress Bailee Madison as Grace Russell.

The show made Hallmark network history during the series finale, which featured the first television show same-sex kiss between main characters on the network.

Series overview

As with the previous seven TV movies, the series continues the spirited life of newly widowed Cassie Nightingale, the good-hearted enchantress of the fictional Middleton, with her now-teenaged daughter Grace. When new neighbors the Radfords, move in next door, they become suspicious of Cassie and her daughter. The dynamics of the series' focus would change during the six seasons, which later saw the Nightingales and Radfords become friendlier and more romantic, leading to Cassie's marrying for the second time, while at the same time shifted to stories involving its residents (including their relationships with others), an ongoing mystery, and a series of curses that tied to Cassie's lineage.

Cast

Main
Catherine Bell as Cassandra "Cassie" Nightingale: She is the owner of a shop called Bell, Book and Candle and runs a bed and breakfast at Grey House. Cassie is psychic and uses her intuition (and at times, a little magic) for good reasons. She marries Sam in the fifth season.
Bailee Madison as Grace Russell (main seasons 1–5, guest season 7): Cassie's teenaged daughter and half-sister of Brandon and Lori who has her own "intuitive charm". She leaves Middleton to attend college at the end of the fifth season. Madison briefly returned as Grace for a remote cameo appearance in the third episode of season seven. 
James Denton as Dr. Sam Radford: Cassie's handsome neighbor and the town's new doctor, he is fairly wealthy from his experiences as a New York trauma surgeon, owner of his own private practice, on multiple hospital boards, and other activities. Sam and Cassie get married in the beginning of season five.
Sarah Power as Abigail Pershing: Cassie's cousin, she has her own magical touch similar to Cassie's, but uses it in her own way.
Catherine Disher as Martha Tinsdale is the mayor of Middleton.
Kylee Evans as Stephanie Borden is the owner of a local bistro and a close friend of Cassie.
Anthony Lemke as Ryan Elliot (main season 1; recurring season 2) is a realtor and Cassie's friend, although he also harbored romantic feelings for her.
Peter MacNeill as George O'Hanrahan is the father-in-law of Cassie's late husband Jake and maternal grandfather of Brandon and Lori. He is a grandfather-figure to Grace and helps operate Grey House Bed and Breakfast with Cassie.
Rhys Matthew Bond as Nick Radford (main seasons 2–5; recurring seasons 1, 6) is Sam's troublesome son; since arriving in Middleton, he refuses to accept his new home and constantly wishes to go back to New York.
Dan Jeannotte as Brandon Russell (main season 2; recurring seasons 1, 3–4; guest season 5): Cassie's stepson and Grace's older half-brother, he married Tara in the seventh movie. He becomes a police officer like his late father, in the first season.
Ashley Leggat (recurring season 1)/Rebecca Dalton (main season 2; recurring seasons 3–4; guest season 5) as Tara Russell: Brandon's wife, she was formerly a graduate student and worked for Cassie at Bell, Book and Candle. Leggat reprised her role from the film series in the first season, but was replaced by Dalton in season 2.
Marc Bendavid as Donovan Davenport (seasons 5–7): the mayor of Blairsville and Abigail's love interest.
Scott Cavalheiro as Adam Hawkins (seasons 5–7): the hospital pastor and Stephanie's love interest.
Gianpaolo Venuta as Vincent (seasons 5, 7): Cassie's world-traveling and adventurous foster brother.
Katherine Barrell, as Joy Harper (seasons 6–7): a home renovation designer who comes to Middleton and helps to renovate the Davenport mansion for Martha. She is keeping secrets about her own past, later revealed to be Cassie and Abigail's cousin through her mother Julia, who was Cassie's second cousin. She also has a magical touch and intuition, including an ability to envision dreams.

Recurring
Noah Cappe as Derek Sanders (seasons 1–4): Middleton's chief of police, whom Mayor Martha Tinsdale appointed after Cassie's husband Jake died
Paul Miller as Tom Tinsdale: Martha's husband and previous mayor of Middleton
Hannah Endicott-Douglas as Lori Russell (seasons 1–2): Cassie's stepdaughter and Brandon's sister, who is now a writer
Shane Harte as Anthony (season 1): Grace's best friend
Gabrielle Miller as Linda Wallace (seasons 1–2; guest season 5): Sam's ex-wife and Nick's mother
Kate Corbett as Eve (seasons 2–4): the receptionist at Dr. Sam Radford's clinic
Jefferson Brown as Ben Patterson (seasons 2–4): a handyman who opened the Middleton Cinema and Stephanie's former boyfriend
Dan Payne as John Dover (season 2): Cassie's former college friend, he arrives in Middleton, during the second season, for a teaching job, and renews his interest in dating her.
Art Hindle as Arthur (seasons 4, 6): Abigail's estranged father
Sebastian Pigott as Phil Sturgis (season 4): A Grey House guest and creator of a high-tech dating app, he briefly dates Abigail before moving to Portland.
Kyana Teresa as Zoey Taylor (season 7): A firefighter and Joy's love interest

Production
The series is filmed in Toronto, Ontario, primarily at Cinespace Film Studios' Kipling Avenue facility.  However, season six had the cast and crew travel to Cambridge, Ontario, to film some pivotal scenes.

As producer Orly Adelson was president of ITV Studios America in 2014, ITV agreed to become the franchise's TV series distributor outside of North America.

Reception 
In May 2017, the show placed second for four straight weeks, behind AMC’s Breaking Bad spin-off, Better Call Saul. In 2017, Mike Hale of The New York Times noted that the series has been "ignored by critics and never nominated for an Emmy or a Golden Globe (or any other major television award in the United States)." Hale continued to explain that the  "Good Witch, averaging more than 2.5 million viewers on Sunday nights on the Hallmark Channel, consistently beat more talked-about shows such as Fargo, The Americans, Silicon Valley, Veep, and Pretty Little Liars." Hale called the series "a gentle, sentimental primetime fable set in an idealized Middle American small city (not an angsty suburb), is the show you find your parents or grandparents watching when you come home for a visit."

In 2019, the show was one of the network's most popular original series, and the Good Witch closed its season five in first place among household ratings on Sundays. The success of the series lifted the Hallmark Channel to be the highest-rated and most-watched cable network on the weekends. In July 2019, Deadline reported that Hallmark Channel renewed the series for a sixth season, and Bailee Madison would be leaving the show. Deadline wrote that "Madison has been on Good Witch series since it launched in 2015, so her exit is bittersweet and emotional."

Accolades
The show won ASCAP Award for Top Television Series at the 2018 ASCAP Film and Television Music Awards. In 2019, the series was nominated for the Saturn Award for Best Fantasy Television Series.

Home media
On October 13, 2015, Hallmark released the first season of Good Witch on DVD. On October 11, 2016, Hallmark released the second season of Good Witch on DVD, which included the Halloween special, "Good Witch Halloween". On September 24, 2019, Hallmark released the fifth season on DVD. The sixth season was released on October 13, 2020. The first five seasons are available internationally on Netflix as of March 23, 2021. Seasons 6 and 7 are available on Netflix as of September 30, 2021.

References

External links
 
 

The Good Witch
2010s American comedy-drama television series
2020s American comedy-drama television series
2010s Canadian comedy-drama television series
2020s Canadian comedy-drama television series
2010s American romantic comedy television series
2020s American romantic comedy television series
2015 American television series debuts
2015 Canadian television series debuts
2021 American television series endings
2021 Canadian television series endings
American fantasy drama television series
American fantasy television series
Canadian fantasy television series
Fiction about curses
Hallmark Channel original programming
Romantic fantasy television series
Television series about cousins
Television series about families
Television series by ITV Studios
Television shows set in the United States
Television shows filmed in Hamilton, Ontario
Television about magic
Witchcraft in television